Diary of a Big Man is a 1988 Hong Kong romantic comedy film directed by veteran producer and actor Chor Yuen, produced by Tsui Hark and starring Chow Yun-fat in the lead role. The film co-stars Sally Yeh, Joey Wong, Waise Lee, Carrie Ng and Kent Cheng as the police inspector.

Plot

The film begins with a comedic narration done by the leading man whom, in a brief introduction calls himself Chow Ting-fat (Chow Yun-fat). He dreamed of becoming wealthy and successful, which also includes marrying beautiful ladies at once. The scene roles to the part where Chow inevitably shields himself from heavy rainfall due to the broken down of his car. There, he met two beautiful women named Joey (Joey Wong), a boutique owner and Sally (Sally Yeh), an air-hostess whom he later marries (with Joey in America and Sally in Paris) who does not know about Chow's two timing marriage. As time goes by, Chow thought that his dreams came true, so he decides to be a two timing bigamist by making himself a schedule of timetables; in which he could spend his time carefully and comfortably with his wives without being noticed. His personal life is imperishable until one day, when Sally decide to fly back to Hong Kong to give Chow an early birthday surprise celebration; thus, spoiling his scheduled time planned for Joey's visit.

Chow then enlisted the help of his best friend and partner Chi-hung (Waise Lee) for every single emergency backup. They scripted numerous sign languages and indirect excuses to prevent the wives from knowing that Chow is a definite bigamist. Many of their plans worked out well, but that doesn't stop the worse of the worse from uncovering the truth. First, Chow was unfortunate that he had an accident with a police Inspector Cheng (Kent Cheng) which it resulted him being sent to the hospital for an emergency treatment. He narrowly escapes both his wives' awareness and eventually, he has chosen to follow Sally as she reaches the hospital first before Joey's arrival; avoiding her detection. Meanwhile, after hearing both women pleading to look for the same patient, the Inspector that Chow had met earlier in the accident begin to suspect about the relationship between him (Chow) and the women. Chi-hung was eventually dragged into pretending as Chow which he managed to block every single questions asked by the inspector, saying that he is indeed one of the many Chows located in Hong Kong. Convinced, the inspector left without a clue after misleadingly thought that Joey is crazy despite Chi Hung's lies.

Chow's nightmare paced up when the coincidence of both wives becoming good friends occurred at Joey's Boutique and later on at the hair salon. Joey decides to throw a personal birthday party for her and Chow while Sally accompanies him to her house. Chi-hung was once again called to the rescue, but this time Chow managed to intervene the situation by mixing up Sally's suspicion; saying that Chi-hung is his best friend and Joey's "husband". Chow once again narrowly escaped being suspected as a bigamist through:(Chi-hung's just in time arrival &  purposely by having his face slammed on the birthday cake written with caption of "Joey Love Fat". He told Joey that the police Inspector Cheng is a psychopath in order to prevent her and Sally from being further questioned; Chow also scares Cheng off by pretending to be Chi-hung's gay partner; leading him to believe that they are gays).

With Chow's constant avoidance, Chi-hung suffered a hilariously overburdened depression. This eventually led to his jealous colleague and girlfriend Ka-lai's (Carrie Ng) attention, who thinks that her boyfriend is having an affair with some other women. Tensions and nervousness begin to lubricate to its peak when every invitations occur in a restaurant with all Chow, his wives, Chi-hung and Ka-lai meeting up together at the same time. Sally and Joey made good friends with Ka-lai, whereas Chow even ridiculously told Joey that he must pretend to be Sally's lover, so as Chi Hung being forced to pretend as Ka-lai's lover(in which both wives timidly believing that their husband's act is by helping Chi Hung getting off his peril, once again wiping out Ka-lai's suspicion). During their first year wedding anniversary, Sally and Joey ended up bumping onto each other again coincidentally (also with Ka-lai around) in a photo shop, and there the ladies finally discovered that their husband was all along a two timing bigamist via the display of their wedding albums; both with Chow as their husband (with Sally's in Paris, France and Joey's in America ).

Angry and desperate, the ladies purposely planned a vacation for the men where they are brought to a hotel for their valentine celebration. Unaware about the wives' intention, Chow was surprised to see that he was on a bed with both women tied up left and right next to him. Chow once again calls up Chi Hung to his aid, taking the risk crossing over to Chow's room by climbing out his. The plan was an epic failure; with Chow being fooled by his pretended to drunk wives and tied up on bed, where both Sally and Joey taking their own sweet time teaching their man a lesson (which includes him being slapped, beaten by thugs, squeezing an orange to his mouth, strips him naked and lighting up the hotel room's fire distinguishing system; making him cold and wet before both of them sadly leaving him for good).

After a failed attempt to woo back his wives, Chow decided to chase them back from leaving Hong Kong. The wives didn't leave but instead, optimistically discussed among themselves who should be Chow's one and only love as he could only choose one by the right of law. Coincidentally unaware that the police forces (led by Inspector Cheng) are having a tactical strike out against two criminals, with one being (Shing Fui-On), the arrival of Chow and his wives (near the location they first met) alerted the criminals who later on held both wives as hostages under the police's surroundings. The wives exaggeratedly gone rage and beats up the two criminals after witnessing that their husband is being shot in the arm (which the incident includes the ladies purportedly snatching off the criminals' pistols and clumsily pulling the triggers at them - with bullets hilariously missing them in the process). Afraid to lose their lives under the ladies mere clumsiness, the criminals then voluntarily and willingly surrendered themselves to the police, which the coincidental accident has unpredictably eased up the inspector and his team.

Before the film ends, Chow apologizes to wives under a heavy rain and stated that it is better for them to live on without him; thus, sending them home by calling a taxi, with both of them sadly looking at him before he walks away from the rain.

Trivia

The post credit scene shows Chow Ting-fat chanting ancient prayers (seemingly in Middle Eastern attire) and together with him are two women who turns out to be Sally and Joey in their respective Middle Eastern traditional attires as well. It is purportedly believed that Chow and his wives had converted into Middle Eastern religion, which explains that they are happily married. Chi-hung then appears in business suit, bringing four of his wives with one being a funny upset looking Ka-lai as his fourth wife before the film ends entirely.

Cast

 Chow Yun-fat as Chow Ting-fat - A two timing bigamist who always had a wish of marrying two beautiful wives and eventually succeed in the process. But everything has got a price, as he must prevent his bigamous personality from being exposed by his wives.
 Sally Yeh as Sally - A beautiful, yet timid air-hostess who really believes that her husband is single before catching him as a two timing bigamist.
 Joey Wong as Joey - A beautiful boutique owner who also marries Chow unaware of his two timing bigamist with the other woman being Sally.
 Waise Lee as Chi-hung - Chow Ting-fat's best friend and partner in the stock market company who dedicated his very best to help Chow covering his bigamous personality and often ends up being back fired by his friend's causes.
 Carrie Ng  as Ka-lai - Chi Hung's over suspicious and jealous colleague & girlfriend.
 Kent Cheng as Inspector Cheng - A rather comedic, sarcastic and emotionless police detective whom became suspicious over Chow's situation. He is relentless but also clueless upon meeting Chow and gang.
 Shing Fui-On as criminal
 David Wu as David
 James Wong as Helper in Beauty Salon

References

External links
 

1988 films
1988 romantic comedy films
Hong Kong romantic comedy films
Hong Kong slapstick comedy films
1980s Cantonese-language films
Films directed by Chor Yuen
Films set in Hong Kong
Films shot in Hong Kong
1980s Hong Kong films